Mátraballa is a village in Heves County, Northern Hungary Region, Hungary.

Geography

The village is located on the northern border of the Mátra.

Communications
Mátraballa is  both from Road 23. 
The Kisterenye-Kál-Kápolna railway line passes through the village, and Mátraballa railway station closed on 5 March 2007.

Sights to visit
 Millennium Miracle Monument - A work of Róbert Király, sculptor;  
 Country House - The objects of everyday use in the village can be seen here;  
 Church (originally in 1696 it was a stone church in this place);  
 World War heroic monument (before the church);  
 Parish (Petőfi u. 1.) - historic building, built in 1806 by the Orczy family.

References

External links

  in Hungarian
 Polgármesteri Hivatal, Mátraballa 

Populated places in Heves County